Boris Mayer Levinson (July 1, 1907 -  April 2, 1984) was an American psychologist who accidentally discovered the therapeutic benefits of animal-assisted therapy.

Biography

Early life and education

Levinson was born to Jewish parents in the Lithuanian town of Kalvarija, Suwałki Governorate, then in the Russian partition of the Russian Empire. He was the third eldest of four siblings. When Levinson was 14, his family emigrated in 1923 to the United States to New York City. The Levinson family established themselves in Brooklyn, East New York. He graduated from Eastern District High School in Brooklyn and afterwards became a naturalized U.S. citizen in 1930.

Early career

Continuing with his studies, Levinson did a Bachelor of Science at City University of New York in 1937 and in 1938 he earned a Master of Science in Education. In 1947, he earned his PhD in clinical psychology from New York University. His dissertation, "A Comparative Study of Certain Homeless and Unattached Domiciled Men," lead him to become a pioneer in the study of homeless men. He wrote several articles about the topic. He also wrote about other topics, such as the psychological traits of children of traditional Jewish backgrounds, childhood autism, intellectual disability and animal assisted therapy.

Animal-Assisted Therapy

In 1953, while giving therapy to a withdrawn child he observed that the child opened up to his dog, Jingles, by talking to it. It led to the accidental discovery about the possibility of using a dog in therapy. Initially, he dismissed the idea, but later, in 1961, wrote an article titled "The dog as a "co-therapist"," which he later presented at a meeting of the American Psychological Association. Many of the audience met him with ridicule, while some others accepted his ideas. Levinson's first article about the human-animal bond cemented the way to later research and ideas in this field. He also coined the term "pet therapy" on his second article about the human-animal bond in 1964.

He continued to write more articles about the topic, as well as books. He's known as one of the fathers of the field of animal-assisted therapy.

Personal life 
In 1934, Levinson married his first wife, Ruth Berkowitz, and they had two sons. They later divorced and Levinson married for the second time to Aida Peñaranda, a diplomat from Bolivia, in 1974.

Death 
Levinson died of a heart attack in 1984. He was the director of human animal companion therapy at the Blueberry Center and was professor emeritus of psychology of Yeshiva University.

References 

1907 births
1984 deaths
People from Kalvarija, Lithuania
American people of Lithuanian-Jewish descent
20th-century American psychologists
Jewish psychologists
Lithuanian Jews
Polish emigrants to the United States